Muaither is a district  of Al Rayyan City in Qatar, located in the municipality of Al Rayyan.

Etymology
Referencing the area's geography, 'muaither' is derived from the Arabic 'mathar', meaning "place where animals are kept". Muaither is situated in a rawda (depression), meaning that water runoff accumulates in it, leading to increased plant activity. Various perennials such as the samr tree and fennel grow here. As such, the area serves as a good grazing area for Bedouins rearing their livestock.

Administration
When free elections of the Central Municipal Council first took place in Qatar during 1999, Muaither was designated the seat of constituency no. 15. It would remain seat of constituency no. 15 in the next three consecutive elections until the fifth municipal elections in 2015, when it was decided that it would become the seat of constituency no. 12. It is the only electoral district in its constituency.

In the inaugural municipal elections in 1999, Hamad Abdullah Al-Marri won the elections, receiving 33.1%, or 188 votes. Trailing behind him with 22%, or 125 votes was Dafi Rashid Al-Marri. Voter turnout was 78.7%. Hamad Abdullah Al-Marri was defeated by Dafi Rashid Al-Marri in the 2002 elections, who then lost his seat to Mohammed Ali Al-Neda in 2007. In both the 2011 and 2015 elections, Al-Neda was successful in retaining his seat.

Landmarks
Muaither Gardens on Rawdat Jarrah Street.
Q-Post office on Muaither S Street.
Muaither Family Park on Al Bahtari Street.
Muaither Park on Al Aqda Street.

Health
Al-Hekma Medical Complex, a health care facility, is located in Muaither.

Transport
Currently, the underground Muaither Metro Station is under construction, having been launched during Phase 2B. Once completed, it will be part of Doha Metro's Green Line.

Sports
Muaither is currently represented by Muaither SC, a multi-sports club whose football team competes in the second division of Qatari football.

Education
The following schools are located in Muaither:

References

Populated places in Al Rayyan